Modak (Sanskrit: मोदक; Japanese: 歓喜団; Thai: โมทกะ or ขนมต้ม; Malaysian: Kuih modak; Indonesian: Kue modak; Burmese: မုန့်လုံးရေပေါ်), also referred to as Koḻukattai (கொழுக்கட்டை) in Tamil, is an Indian sweet dumpling dish popular in many Indian states and cultures. According to Hindu and Buddhist beliefs, it is considered one of the favourite dishes of Lord Ganesha and the Buddha and is therefore used in prayers. The sweet filling on the inside of a modak consists of freshly grated coconut and jaggery, while the outer soft shell is made from rice flour or wheat flour mixed with khava or maida flour. 

There are two types of modak, fried and steamed. The steamed version (called ukdiche modak) is often served hot with ghee.

Religious significance

Hinduism
Modak is considered to be the favourite sweet of the Hindu deity, Ganesha. From it, he gets the moniker modakapriya (one who likes modak) in Sanskrit. The word modak means "small part of bliss" and it symbolises spiritual knowledge. During Ganesh Chaturthi, the puja usually concludes with an offering of 21 or 101 modaks to Ganesha. Modaks made with rice flour shells are often preferred for this purpose, although wheat shell versions are also used. Local businesses outside Ganesh Temples across India usually sell pre-packed/ready-made versions of modaks.

Buddhism
Modak is also considered to be the favourite sweet of Gautama Buddha. During Buddha's Birthday, modaks are offered to the Buddha.

Japan
In Japan, a sweet similar to modak and known locally as kangidan (歓喜団), is offered to both the god Kangiten, the Japanese version of Lord Ganesha, and the Buddha. Kangidans are made from curds, honey, and red bean paste. They are wrapped in kneaded dough made from parched flour and shaped like a bun before they are deep fried. However, as the majority of Japanese are non-religious, it can be eaten at any occasions such as Shōgatsu, Culture Day, Christmas, Halloween, birthdays and retirement parties.

Malay world
In the Malay world, modaks are known as kuih modak (in Malaysia, Brunei and Singapore) or kue modak (in Indonesia).

Myanmar
In Myanmar, modaks are known as Mont lone yay baw (မုန့်လုံးရေပေါ်) and is eaten during Thingyan.

Thailand
In Thailand, modaks are known locally as Khanom tom (ขนมต้ม) and are offered to Phikanet or Phra Phikanesuan (the Thai version of Lord Ganesha) and the Buddha. It is covered in coconut shreds.

Varieties

See also

 List of dumplings
 List of Indian sweets and desserts
 Maharashtrian cuisine
 List of Japanese desserts and sweets
 List of Thai desserts and snacks
 Kue
 Kuih
 Mantou
 Mandu
 Manti
 Mont lone yay baw

References

External links
 Ukdiche Modak

Dumplings
Buddhist symbols
Bruneian snack foods
Indian desserts
Maharashtrian cuisine
Goan cuisine
Konkani cuisine
Kue
Hindu symbols
Japanese desserts and sweets
Indian cuisine
Malaysian snack foods
Singaporean cuisine
Thai desserts and snacks
Foods containing coconut
Ganesha
Gautama Buddha